Ålandscupen  is a local football competition for Åland which is administered by the ÅFF. The cup competition was first introduced in 1943 and continues to be dominated by IFK Mariehamn who have won the Ålandscupen 42 times.

Finals

External links
 Ålandscupen - Ålands Fotbollförbund 

Football in Åland
Football cup competitions in Finland
1943 establishments in Finland
Recurring sporting events established in 1943